Francisco "Quino" Cabrera Guinovart (born 5 March 1971) is a Spanish former professional footballer who played as an attacking midfielder.

Club career
Cabrera was born in Málaga. He played two seasons in La Liga in his country, with hometown's CD Málaga in 1989–90 and Andalusia neighbours Cádiz CF in 1992–93, with both spells ending in relegation. With the latter side, he dropped down another tier the following campaign.

Cabrera then resumed his career in Segunda División and Segunda División B. In the summer of 2001 he signed with Livingston, from CD Badajoz. He scored on his debut in a 2–1 home win against Heart of Midlothian, helping the team to the third place in the Scottish Premier League in his first year and going on to appear in 99 competitive games for the Livi Lions, scoring ten goals.

In February 2004, Cabrera returned to Spain and joined former club CF Gavà, eventually retiring after the 2009–10 season at the age of 39, with the Catalans being relegated to the Tercera División.

References

External links

Stats and bio at Cadistas1910 

1971 births
Living people
Footballers from Málaga
Spanish footballers
Association football midfielders
La Liga players
Segunda División players
Segunda División B players
Tercera División players
Atlético Malagueño players
CD Málaga footballers
Cádiz CF players
CF Gavà players
Málaga CF players
Recreativo de Huelva players
CD Badajoz players
Scottish Premier League players
Livingston F.C. players
Spanish expatriate footballers
Expatriate footballers in Scotland
Spanish expatriate sportspeople in Scotland